Pontdrif is a border crossing between South Africa and Botswana on the Limpopo River in Limpopo. The borderpost is situated just west of Mapungubwe National Park.

The crossing is impassable to vehicles when the Limpopo is in flood; an open steel cage cable car carries pedestrians across the river for a fee of R30 or P30 (May 2014).

References

Botswana–South Africa border crossings